Baldwin Spencer may refer to:

 Baldwin Spencer (politician), prime minister of Antigua and Barbuda
 Walter Baldwin Spencer, biologist